"Gas Pedal" is a song by American rapper Sage the Gemini with additional vocals from fellow Bay Area rapper Iamsu!. It was produced by Dominic Wynn Woods and written by Woods and Sudan Williams. It was released on March 21, 2013 as the second single from his debut studio album Remember Me. "Gas Pedal" peaked at number 29 on the Billboard Hot 100, making this the first top 40 hit for both artists, and making it one of the best known songs in the hyphy genre. It also reached the top ten on the Hot R&B/Hip-Hop Songs and Hot Rap Songs charts at numbers 6 and 4, respectively. An official remix for the song was released featuring Canadian singer Justin Bieber.

Music video
Directed by SUJ, the video is set in a barely lit mansion where Sage and Iamsu! are dressed in tuxedos surrounded by various women with blank expressions on their face. A woman wearing a red veil wrapped around her face catches Sage's attention and asks for her to be brought over. When the woman is brought over to Sage, she stands still only to dance a little before returning to being still again. The video premiered on the artist's YouTube page on March 21, 2013.

Live performance
Sage and Iamsu! made their U.S. television debut performing "Gas Pedal" on the Late Show with David Letterman on March 27, 2013. The performance garnered little response from the audience, but Sage was a good sport about his performance during an interview he had with RapFix Live: "But it was tight, though, 'cause you could tell it was a real audience, 'cause as soon as I was like, 'How y’all doing out there tonight?' They said, 'Ahhhh,'" Sage continued.

Commercial performance
"Gas Pedal" debuted at number 58 on US Billboard Hot 100 for the week of August 10, 2013. Four weeks later, it peaked at number 29 for the week of September 7 and spent a total of twenty-five weeks on the chart. It reached the top ten on the Hot R&B/Hip-Hop Songs chart, moving four spots from number 11 to number 7 for the week of August 17. It peaked at number 6 the week after on August 24. As of April 5, 2014, the song sold 1.4 million downloads, according to Nielsen SoundScan.

In Canada, the song debuted at number 96 for the week of August 31, 2013 and peaked at number 92 the week after before leaving the chart. It re-entered the chart for the week of January 4, 2014 at number 84 and reached a new peak at number 59 the week after on January 11.

Remix
On December 20, 2013, an official remix for the song was released that featured Canadian singer Justin Bieber performing the opening rap verse and a bridge before the second chorus which peaked at number 100 in the UK Singles Chart.

Charts

Weekly charts

Year-end charts

Certifications

References

2013 singles
2013 songs
Sage the Gemini songs
Iamsu! songs
Republic Records singles
Songs written by Sage the Gemini
Justin Bieber songs